Chiara Brancati (born 20 July 1981) was an Italian female water polo player. She was a member of the Italy women's national water polo team, playing as goalkeeper. 

She was a part of the  team at the 2008 Summer Olympics. On club level she played for Geymonat Orizzonte in Italy.

See also
 Italy women's Olympic water polo team records and statistics
 List of women's Olympic water polo tournament goalkeepers

References

External links
 
 http://orizzontepallanuoto.com/chiara-brancati-e-maddalena-musumeci-tornano-a-giocare-con-lorizzonte-catania/
 http://spettacoliecultura.ilmessaggero.it/libri/berto_bianciardi_chiara_brancati_salone_torino_scrittori_dimenticati-407952.html
 http://deepbluemedia.photoshelter.com/image/I0000A9VkrD1u3Ik
http://www.zimbio.com/photos/Chiara+Brancati/Olympics+Day+5+Water+Polo/p2kq1t5JzD6

1981 births
Living people
Sportspeople from Catania
Italian female water polo players
Water polo goalkeepers
Olympic water polo players of Italy
Water polo players at the 2008 Summer Olympics
21st-century Italian women